Round Mountain is a census-designated place in Shasta County, California, United States. Its population is 160 as of the 2020 census, up from 155 from the 2010 census.

Geography
Round Mountain is located at  (40.799633, -121.943058).

Round Mountain is the geographic center of the Achomawi and Atsugewi or "Pit River" first nation. The "Pit River" tribe has never signed a treaty with the federal government and remains a strong force of opposition to federal control.

Round Mountain is the home of Hill Country Health and Wellness Center, one of the most solvent clinics in California. It also has the highest awarded LEEDS construction certificates of any clinic in California. Hill Country maintains a large youth facility.

Some organic farmers in Round Mountain are members of the Shasta Regional Seed Cooperative and work together to maintain hundreds of heirloom food crops as well as bio-dynamic farming techniques. Many residents are off the grid, using hydroelectric, solar and wind resources for their home power. Some of these forward-thinking residents also maintain local crime-watch activities and network projects to advance the sustainability of the region.

A large electrical substation is in the area, and power lines (Path 66 and a set of connecting wires to Path 15) run through the town.

This plan, called TANC (Transmission Authority of Northern California), was halted by citizens who produced presentations statewide, showing that Department of Energy data conflicted with the project's stated goals. This 1.4 billion dollar TANC project was stopped in about 90 days.

Cedar Creek Elementary School is not currently operating as most Round Mountain students are attending schools in the Mountain Union (K-8) District in nearby Montgomery Creek. Round Mountain Community Center is administered through the local Lion's Club/VFW and has capacity for about 200.

The geography in Round Mountain has been at times very unstable. Several homes, a store, and a nightclub have been among buildings destroyed in landslides. Many of the power lines in the area appear to be constantly repaired due to shifting foundations. After both the Fountain Fire and the introduction of power lines (which increased erosion due to construction as well as due to a program to maintain low or no vegetation under and alongside high-tension wires), slides in the area increased. The location of a major road reconstruction project in 2009 of "the fountain" (a set of curves leading into Round Mountain from the west) became the scene of major shifting, road buckling, and surface water eruptions in the first rain season after completion.

Local geography invites fishing, mountain climbing, and hiking as well as opportunities to experience some of California's wildest land.

Demographics

2010
At the 2010 census Round Mountain had a population of 155. The racial makeup of Round Mountain was 126 (81.3%) White, 2 (0.6%) African American, 12 (7.7%) Native American, 3 (1.9%) Asian, 1 (0.6%) Pacific Islander, 1 (0.6%) from other races, and 11 (7.1%) from two or more races. Hispanic or Latino of any race were 12 people (7.7%).

The whole population lived in households, no one lived in non-institutionalized group quarters and no one was institutionalized.

There were 74 households, 14 (18.9%) had children under the age of 18 living in them, 27 (36.5%) were opposite-sex married couples living together, 4 (5.4%) had a female householder with no husband present, 5 (6.8%) had a male householder with no wife present.  There were 4 (5.4%) unmarried opposite-sex partnerships, and 1 (1.4%) same-sex married couples or partnerships. 31 households (41.9%) were one person and 12 (16.2%) had someone living alone who was 65 or older. The average household size was 2.09.  There were 36 families (48.6% of households); the average family size was 2.92.

The age distribution was 27 people (17.4%) under the age of 18, 12 people (7.7%) aged 18 to 24, 30 people (19.4%) aged 25 to 44, 55 people (35.5%) aged 45 to 64, and 31 people (20.0%) who were 65 or older.  The median age was 47.8 years. For every 100 females, there were 98.7 males.  For every 100 females age 18 and over, there were 106.5 males.

There were 82 housing units at an average density of 48.7 per square mile, of the occupied units 57 (77.0%) were owner-occupied and 17 (23.0%) were rented. The homeowner vacancy rate was 1.7%; the rental vacancy rate was 5.3%.  113 people (72.9% of the population) lived in owner-occupied housing units and 42 people (27.1%) lived in rental housing units.

2000
At the 2000 census there were 122 people, 57 households, and 33 families in the CDP. The racial makeup of the CDP was 85.25% White, 10.66% Native American, and 4.10% from two or more races. Hispanic or Latino of any race were 0.82%.

Of the 57 households 22.8% had children under the age of 18 living with them, 43.9% were married couples living together, 7.0% had a female householder with no husband present, and 42.1% were non-families. 36.8% of households were one person and 12.3% were one person aged 65 or older. The average household size was 2.14 and the average family size was 2.82.

The age distribution was 23.8% under the age of 18, 4.1% from 18 to 24, 23.8% from 25 to 44, 31.1% from 45 to 64, and 17.2% 65 or older. The median age was 43 years. For every 100 females, there were 103.3 males. For every 100 females age 18 and over, there were 93.8 males.

The median household income was $18,250 and the median family income  was $28,125. Males had a median income of $36,250 versus $28,750 for females. The per capita income for the CDP was $9,598. There were 25.9% of families and 28.0% of the population living below the poverty line, including no under eighteens and 13.3% of those over 64.

Politics

History
On August 19, 1992, a wildfire called the Fountain Fire started off Buzzard Roost Road. The Fountain Fire burned , destroying approximately 600 structures in Round Mountain and the nearby communities of Moose Camp and Montgomery Creek.

References

External links
 Redding Record Searchlight Article about the Fountain Fire

Census-designated places in Shasta County, California
Census-designated places in California